The fifth generation of the BMW 5 Series executive cars consists of the BMW E60 (sedan version) and BMW E61 (wagon version, marketed as 'Touring'). The E60/E61 generation was produced by BMW from 2003 to 2010 and is often collectively referred to as the E60.

The E60 generation introduced various new electronic features, including the iDrive infotainment system, head-up display, active cruise control, active steering, adaptive headlights, night vision, lane departure warning and voice control. The E60 was the first 5 Series to be available with a turbocharged petrol engine, a 6-speed automatic transmission and regenerative braking.

The M5 model was introduced in 2005 and is powered by the BMW S85 V10 engine. It was sold in the sedan and wagon body styles, with most cars using the 7-speed SMG III transmission. It was the first and only M5 model to be sold with a V10 engine.

In January 2010, the BMW 5 Series (F10) began production as the successor to the E60.

Development and launch

The development programme for the E60 began in 1997, concluding in 2002. The lead designer was Boyke Boyer. The final design, developed by Davide Arcangeli under BMW Design Director Chris Bangle, was approved in 2000 and German design patents filed on 16 April 2002.

The sedan was launched on 5 July 2003 in Europe and in October 2003 in North America. In late 2004, the Touring models were introduced.

Body styles 

The body of the E60 was made using aluminium for the front of the car, and steel for the passenger cabin and rear. The weight distribution of the sedan models was 50:50.

Interior / Equipment 

The iDrive infotainment system— first introduced in the E65 7 Series— was fitted to all E60 models. The standard iDrive system included a 6.5-inch LCD screen, a single-disc CD/MP3 player, Bluetooth for phone calls (available only on later-build 2004 models, and standard on all 2005 and newer models), basic voice control, and vehicle settings. Optional features included an 8-inch LCD screen, GPS navigation, Sirius Satellite Radio (on North American-spec models), and DVD video playback. iPod and USB integration, HD Radio (on North American-spec models), an auxiliary audio input jack (standard on 2008 and newer models), full voice control, and a multi-disc CD/MP3/DVD changer (mounted in the glove compartment). On North American-spec models, a ten-speaker premium audio system with dual under-seat subwoofers and an amplifier was standard equipment, with a thirteen-speaker Harman Kardon "Logic 7" premium surround sound audio system available as an option on all models.

An emergency hotline feature (BMW Assist) was also available for the E60. The BMW Assist system could also use the phone network to notify the driver and their preferred BMW dealership when servicing was due. This feature was standard on all E60 models sold in the United States.

Other features available in the E60 initially included active cruise control, Bi-Xenon headlights, run-flat tyres, active anti-roll bars, head-up display and active steering. Safety-related items include Dynamic Stability Control (DSC), adaptive headlights and night vision.

In 2009, the iDrive system was upgraded from the first-generation "CCC" interface to the newer "CIC" interface. The audio system control panel added six multifunction preset buttons that could be programmed to store favorite radio stations and frequently-dialed telephone numbers for the Bluetooth hands-free system. The iDrive controller in the center console was also redesigned, and now integrated shortcut keys for frequently-used functions.

Over the E60's lifespan, the following features were added: Active Cruise Control with Stop & Go, keyless entry ("comfort access"), LED taillights, Lane Departure Warning and Brake Force Display.

The E60 was the first 5 Series in 22 years where the centre console was not angled towards the driver, however the E60's successor returned to angling the centre console towards the driver.

In 2003 a 6-speed SMG-II gearbox was offered as an option on the 525i, 530i, 545i and 550i in some markets.

Engines

Petrol 
At launch, the E60 used the previous generation E39 5 Series' M54 straight 6 engine in the 520i, 525i and 530i models. The only petrol model with a new engine at launch was the 545i with the N62 V8. The M54 was phased out after the 2005 model years and replaced with the straight-4 N43 (in the 520i) and the straight-6 N52 engine (in the 525i and 530i). The model range was also expanded the same year to include a wider range of models like the 523i, 540i and 550i. In 2007, the only turbocharged E60 model was introduced, the 535i with the twin-turbo straight-6 N54 engine. This model was exclusive to the North American market and was not sold in Europe.

Diesel 
The only diesel model available at launch was the 530d, which used an updated "TU" version of the M57 engine found in the previous generation E39 5 Series. In 2004 the 535d and 525d were added to the model range which also used different versions of the M57 straight-6 turbo engine. In 2005, the only 4 cylinder diesel model E60 was added to the model range, the 520d using the older M47 engine at first, and later the new N47 engine from 2007. Most of the diesel model range was exclusive to the European market, except a few models which were sold in some countries in Asia. No diesel models were offered in North America.

Transmissions 
Available transmissions are:
 6-speed ZF S6-37 manual (2004–2010)
 6-speed Getrag 217 -- GS6-17BG / GS6-17DG manual (2004–2010)
 6-speed ZF S6-53 manual (2004–2010)
 6-speed ZF 6HP19 automatic (2003–2007)
 6-speed ZF 6HP26 automatic (2003–2007)
 6-speed ZF 6HP28 automatic (2007–2010)
 6-speed GS6S37BZ SMG-II (2003–2010)
 6-speed GS6S53BZ SMG-II (2003–2010)
 7-speed GS7S47BG SMG III (M5 model)

M5 model 

The M5 model of the E60 generation was introduced in 2005 and produced in sedan and wagon body styles. The E60 M5 is powered by the BMW S85 V10 engine, which produces  at 7,750 rpm,  at 6,100 rpm and has a redline of 8,250 rpm. The  acceleration time is 4.7 seconds.

The majority of M5s were sold with a 7-speed automated manual transmission ("SMG III"), however a 6-speed manual was also available in some markets.

Total production of the M5 was 20,548 units, consisting of 19,523 sedans and 1,025 wagons.

Special models

Alpina B5 

Introduced in February 2005, the Alpina B5 and Alpina B5 S were built in sedan and wagon body styles and powered by the  BMW N62 petrol V8 engine (as used by the 545i) with the addition of a centrifugal supercharger.

BMW 5 Series Security 
The E60 was available as 'Security' models, a factory armoured version which was unveiled at the 2005 Frankfurt Motor Show. Built with ballistic steel, aramid, polyethylene and 21mm polycarbonate layered glass it was certified at VR4 level of VPAM's Bullet Resistant Vehicle guidelines (1999). The armoured areas include the entire passenger cell, battery terminals and Engine Control Unit.  As standard they included an intercom system and panic alarm.

The Security models were built using the mechanicals of the 530i or the 550i, with upgraded suspension and braking systems. Production of the Security models began alongside the series model at BMW's Dingolfing plant, with armouring prepared before being shipped to a specialist facility in Toluca, Mexico, where the vehicles complete the final assembly stage.

Long-wheelbase sedan (China only) 
A long-wheelbase (LWB) version of the E60 5 Series was offered in China. Models included the 520Li, 523Li, 525Li, and 530Li.

BMW 5 Series Authority Vehicle 
The 5 Series Authority Vehicle is designed for police forces, fire services, and emergency rescue services. It has a firearm bracket in the rear center armrest.

Safety 

Initially the 5 Series received a three-star rating for adult occupants. However changes were made to the steering column, footrest, door trims, door latch, airbags and electronic software and the car was retested achieving its four-star rating. BMW claims the modifications improved the car's Euro NCAP score, not the vehicle's safety; consequently BMW chose not to recall the earlier-built cars.

The American Insurance Institute for Highway Safety (IIHS) gives the 5 Series a "Good" overall rating in frontal collisions but a "Marginal" overall rating for side impact collisions. The IIHS reported their side impact test would likely cause driver related rib fractures and/or internal organ injuries. The IIHS tests were conducted on models built after May 2007; these models had modifications to improve side impact safety.

2007 facelift 

The 'Life Cycle impulse' (LCI) models were introduced in March 2007 (for the 2008 model year). Styling changes were relatively subtle, and included revised headlights, tail lights and front bumper. The interior was significantly revised. The iDrive system was upgraded with programmable "favourite" shortcut buttons (for 2009 models), a revised menu system, preset buttons for the audio system and the switch from DVD to hard disk based storage (for 2010 models).

Mechanically, the 5 Series gained the new engines and transmissions from the E70 X5. On automatic transmission models, a shift by wire shifter replaced the mechanical version and shift paddles were available for the first time on a 5 Series model besides the M5.

The active cruise control was upgraded to bring the vehicle to a complete stop and accelerate from stationary (called "Stop & Go"). Other changes include adaptive headlights, LED rear lights, Lane Departure Warning, night vision and Brake Force Display. The E60 LCI was the first BMW to feature regenerative braking.

Production 
Production of the E60/E61 occurred at the BMW Group Plant Dingolfing in Germany and at the BMW Brilliance plant in China.

Complete knock-down assembly of German-produced kits took place in Thailand, Egypt, Russia and Malaysia.

References

E60
5 Series
Euro NCAP executive cars
Sedans
Station wagons
Cars introduced in 2003
2010s cars